Florence Dagmar Oberg (October 22, 1895 – May 7, 1986) was an American silent film actress. She had several leading roles and worked for the Famous Players-Lasky film company, appearing at least twice with Thomas Meighan and Victor Moore while being directed by Cecil B. DeMille.

Born to Swedish parents in Oregon, Dagmar was a stage actress in the Pacific Northwest before relocating with her family to Los Angeles and pursuing a film career. She began her film career in 1914, appearing in several features including DeMille's The Man from Home. She subsequently appeared in DeMille's Kindling (1915). Other credits include the drama Blackbirds, the Western Chimmie Fadden Out West, and The Clown.

Biography
Dagmar was born in Portland, Oregon in 1895. Both her parents were immigrants from Sweden. She was active in stock theater in San Francisco, Seattle and Spokane, Washington, prior to becoming a film actress, often appearing in ingenue roles. As a child, she relocated to Los Angeles with her parents, and embarked on a career in films. In Los Angeles, Dagmar became affiliated with Constance Crawley and film director Arthur Maude.

After appearing in films for Phillips Smalley, Dagmar was noticed by Cecil B. DeMille, who offered her a film contract with the Players Lasky, which she accepted. Her first appearance for DeMille was in The Call of the North (1914). In 1917, Dagmar married Roy Somers, a fellow actor in the Players Lasky. Her role in 1915's Young Romance was praised by The Owensboro Messenger, who noted that she "raises her "bit" to a place among the principals."

Death
Dagmar died in Sacramento, California on May 7, 1986.

Filmography

Notes

References

External links

 
 

1895 births
1986 deaths
Actresses from Portland, Oregon
American people of Swedish descent
American silent film actresses
American stage actresses
20th-century American actresses